Each "article" in this category is a collection of entries about several stamp issuers, presented in alphabetical order. The entries are formulated on the micro model and so provide summary information about all known issuers.

See the :Category:Compendium of postage stamp issuers page for details of the project.

Gabon 

Dates 	1959 –
Capital 	Libreville
Currency 	100 centimes = 1 franc

Includes 	Gabon (French Colony)

See also 	French Equatorial Africa

Gabon (French Colony) 

Dates 	1886 – 1937
Capital 	Libreville
Currency 	100 centimes = 1 franc

Refer 	Gabon

Galápagos Islands 

Dates 	1957 – 1959
Capital 	San Cristóbal (Puerto Baquerizo)
Currency 	100 centavos = 1 sucre

Main Article 

See also 	Ecuador

Galata 

Refer 	Constantinople (Russian Post Office)

Galicia 

Refer 	West Ukraine

Gambia 

Dates 	1869 – 
Capital 	Banjul (formerly Bathurst)
Currency 	(1869) 12 pence = 1 shilling; 20 shillings = 1 pound
		(1971) 100 bututs = 1 dalasy

Main Article  Postage stamps and postal history of the Gambia

Gaspé 

Refer 	New Carlisle (Gaspé)

Gaza (Egyptian Occupation) 

Dates 	1948 – 1967
Currency 	1000 milliemes = 100 piastres = 1 Egyptian pound

Refer 	Egyptian Occupation Issues

Gaza (Indian UN Force) 

Dates 	1965 only
Currency 	100 paisa = 1 rupee

Refer 	Indian Overseas Forces

Gdansk 

Refer 	Danzig (Polish Post Office)

GEA 

Refer 	German East Africa

General Gouvernement 

Refer 	Poland (German Occupation World War II)

General Postal Union 

Refer 	Universal Postal Union (UPU)

Geneva 

Dates 	1843 – 1850
Currency 	100 centimes = 1 franc

Refer 	Swiss Cantonal Issues

See also 	League of Nations (Geneva);
		United Nations (UN)

Georgia 

Dates 	1993 – 
Capital 	Tbilisi
Currency 	(1993) 100 kopecks = 1 Russian ruble
		(1993) 100 tetri = 1 lari

Main Article  Postage stamps and postal history of Georgia

Includes 	Georgia (pre – Soviet)

See also 	Transcaucasian Federation;
		Union of Soviet Socialist Republics (USSR)

Georgia (pre-Soviet) 

Dates 	1919 – 1923
Capital 	Tbilisi
Currency 	100 kopecks = 1 Georgian rouble

Refer 	Georgia

See also 	Transcaucasian Federation;
		Union of Soviet Socialist Republics (USSR)

German Cameroun 

Refer 	Kamerun

German Colonies 
Main Article   Postage stamps and postal history of the German colonies

Includes 	Caroline Islands;
		German East Africa;
		German New Guinea;
		German Samoa;
		German South West Africa;
		German Togo;
		Kamerun;
		Kiautschou;
		Mariana Islands (Marianen);
		Marshall Islands (German Colony)

German Commands 

Refer 	Eastern Command Area;
		Western Command Area

German East Africa 

Dates 	1893 – 1916
Capital 	Dar-es-Salaam
Currency 	(1893) 64 pesa = 100 heller = 1 rupee
		(1905) 100 heller = 1 rupee

Refer 	German Colonies

See also 	German East Africa (Belgian Occupation);
		German East Africa (British Occupation);
		Tanganyika

German East Africa (Belgian Occupation) 

Dates 	1916 – 1918
Currency 	100 centimes = 1 franc

Refer 	Belgian Occupation Issues

German East Africa (British Occupation) 

Dates 	1917 only
Currency 	100 cents = 1 rupee

Refer 	British Occupation Issues

German East Africa (Portuguese Occupation) 

Refer 	Kionga

German Levant 

Refer 	German Post Offices in the Turkish Empire

German New Guinea 

Dates 	1898 – 1914
Capital 	Rabaul
Currency 	100 pfennige = 1 mark

Refer 	German Colonies

See also 	Papua New Guinea

German Ninth Army Post 

Dates 	1918 only
Currency 	100 bani = 1 leu

Refer 	German Occupation Issues (World War I)

See also 	Rumania (German Occupation)

German Occupation Issues (World War I) 

Dates 	1914 – 1918

Main Article  

Includes 	Belgium (German Occupation);
		Dorpat (German Occupation);
		Eastern Command Area;
		German Ninth Army Post;
		Poland (German Occupation World War I);
		Rumania (German Occupation);
		Western Command Area

German Occupation Issues (World War II) 

Dates 	1939 – 1945

Main Article  

Includes 	Albania (German Occupation);
		Alsace (German Occupation);
		Dalmatia (German Occupation);
		Estonia (German Occupation);
		Laibach (German Occupation);
		Latvia (German Occupation);
		Lithuania (German Occupation);
		Lorraine (German Occupation);
		Luxembourg (German Occupation);
		Macedonia (German Occupation);
		Montenegro (German Occupation);
		Ostland;
		Poland (German Occupation World War II);
		Serbia (German Occupation);
		Ukraine (German Occupation);
		Zante (German Occupation)

German Post Offices Abroad 
Main Article   German post offices abroad

Includes 	China (German Post Offices);
		German Post Offices in the Turkish Empire;
		Morocco (German Post Offices);
		Zanzibar (German Postal Agency)

German Post Offices in the Turkish Empire 

Dates 	1884 – 1914
Currency 	(1884) 40 paras = 1 piastre
		(1908) 100 centimes = 1 franc

Refer 	German Post Offices Abroad

German Samoa 

Dates 	1900 – 1914
Capital 	Apia
Currency 	100 pfennige = 1 mark

Refer 	German Colonies

German South West Africa 

Dates 	1888 – 1915
Capital 	Windhoek
Currency 	100 pfennige = 1 mark

Refer 	German Colonies

See also 	Namibia;
		South West Africa

German States 

Main Article  

Includes 	Bergedorf;
		Bremen;
		Brunswick;
		Hamburg;
		Hanover;
		Holstein;
		Lübeck;
		Mecklenburg-Schwerin;
		Mecklenburg-Strelitz;
		Oldenburg;
		Saxony;
		Schleswig;
		Schleswig-Holstein;
		Thurn & Taxis

See also 	Baden;
		Bavaria;
		Germany (Imperial);
		North German Confederation;
		Prussia;
		Württemberg

German Togo 

Dates 	1897 – 1914
Capital 	Lomé
Currency 	100 pfennige = 1 mark

Refer 	German Colonies

Germany 

Dates 	1991 – 
Capital 	Berlin
Currency 	(1991) 100 pfennige = 1 mark (DM)
		(2002) 100 cent = 1 euro

Main Article   Postage stamps and postal history of Germany

See also 	Germany (Allied Occupation);
		Germany (Imperial);
		Germany (Third Reich);
		Germany (Weimar Republic);
		East Germany;
		West Berlin;
		West Germany

Germany (Allied Occupation) 

Dates 	1945 – 1949

Main Article  

Includes 	American, British & Russian Zones (General Issues);
		Anglo-American Zones (Civil Government);
		Anglo-American Zones (Military Government);
		Baden (French Zone);
		Berlin – Brandenburg (Russian Zone);
		French Zone (General Issues);
		Mecklenburg-Vorpommern (Russian Zone);
		North West Saxony (Russian Zone);
		Rhineland-Palatinate (French Zone);
		Russian Zone (General Issues);
		Saar (French Zone);
		Saxony (Russian Zone);
		South East Saxony (Russian Zone);
		Thuringia (Russian Zone);
		Württemberg (French Zone)

See also 	East Germany;
		Germany;
		West Berlin;
		West Germany

Germany (Belgian Occupation) 

Dates 	1919 – 1920
Currency 	100 centimes = 1 franc

Refer 	Belgian Occupation Issues

See also 	Eupen & Malmedy (Belgian Occupation)

Germany (Imperial) 

Dates 	1872 – 1919
Capital 	Berlin
Currency 	100 pfennige = 1 Reichsmark

Main Article  

See also 	Germany;
		Germany (Allied Occupation);
		Germany (Third Reich);
		Germany (Weimar Republic);
		East Germany;
		West Berlin;
		West Germany

Germany (Third Reich) 

Dates 	1933 – 1945
Capital 	Berlin
Currency 	100 pfennige = 1 Reichsmark

Main Article  

See also 	Germany;
		Germany (Allied Occupation);
		Germany (Imperial);
		Germany (Weimar Republic);
		East Germany;
		West Berlin;
		West Germany

Germany (Weimar Republic) 

Dates 	1919 – 1932
Capital 	Berlin
Currency 	100 pfennige = 1 Reichsmark

Main Article  

See also 	Germany;
		Germany (Allied Occupation);
		Germany (Imperial);
		Germany (Third Reich);
		East Germany;
		West Berlin;
		West Germany

References

Bibliography
 Stanley Gibbons Ltd, Europe and Colonies 1970, Stanley Gibbons Ltd, 1969
 Stanley Gibbons Ltd, various catalogues
 Stuart Rossiter & John Flower, The Stamp Atlas, W H Smith, 1989
 XLCR Stamp Finder and Collector's Dictionary, Thomas Cliffe Ltd, c.1960

External links
 AskPhil – Glossary of Stamp Collecting Terms
 Encyclopaedia of Postal History

Gabon